Market is a 2003 Indian crime film directed by Jay Prakash, starring Manisha Koirala.  The film follows the story of Muskaan Bano (Manisha Koirala) from her life in Indian brothels after being sold there by her Arab husband to her attempts at revenge later in life. The film garnered a decent opening and was a surprise success of the year. It was declared "average" at the box office.

Cast 
 Manisha Koirala as Muskaan Bano (Sex worker) & Mallika (Club Dancer)
 Pratima Kazmi as Khaala ( Sex worker/Brothel Den Owner)
 Aryan Vaid as Bablu Pandey
 Suman Ranganathan as Lisa
 Johnny Lever
 Shweta Menon as Isha
 Makrand Deshpande as Anthony
 Govind Namdeo as Anna
 Sayaji Shinde

Music

References

External links 
 

2003 films
2000s Hindi-language films
2003 drama films
Films about prostitution in India